The culture of Brittany is made up of Breton culture, and Celtic culture.  Brittany's strongest international connections tend to be in the United Kingdom, particularly in the Celtic groups of Cornwall and Wales, and in Canada.

Brittany is the English-language name for the region called Breizh in the native Breton language, and Bretagne in French. Once independent, as the Duchy of Brittany, and then a duchy within France, Brittany is now the name of an administrative area (région), whose capital is Rennes.

Local languages
 Breton language, a Celtic language.

Costume
 bigouden
 bagads
 biniou
 kouign amann

Festivals
Fest Noz
Festival Interceltique de Lorient
Kalan Goañv

Flag
 Flag of Brittany

Music
 Bro Gozh ma Zadoù
 Breton music

See also
 Outline of culture
 Outline of France

External links
 BLOG BREIZH - Blog of information about Brittany
 Coiffe pictures. Le Festival Interceltique de Lorient 2002
 French Wikipedia links
 Lexique du costume breton
 Culture bretonne